Laughton Place is a historic building near Lewes, Sussex owned by the Landmark Trust. The Pelham family bought Laughton Place, an old fortified manor, in 1466; it was rebuilt in 1534 by William Pelham. Laughton Tower was restored under the supervision of architect John Warren in the 1980s.

Buildings and structures in East Sussex
Landmark Trust properties in England
Towers in East Sussex
Place